The Vision Mercedes-Maybach 6 is a concept car unveiled by German car manufacturer Mercedes-Benz, under its Maybach division, at the 2016 Pebble Beach Concours d'Elegance.

Specifications and Performance

The car was driven by Drake in the music video for his song Laugh Now Cry Later. The car will also be featured in the 2022 movie The Flash where Bruce Wayne will be driving it.
The car also uses gull-wing doors.

Gallery

See also 
 Maybach Exelero

References

External links 

 Official website

Maybach vehicles
Mercedes-Benz concept vehicles
Coupés
Grand tourers
Electric concept cars
All-wheel-drive vehicles
2010s cars
Cars introduced in 2016